Snooker world rankings 1992/1993: The professional world rankings for the top 32 snooker players and two others from the top 64 in the 1992–93 season are listed below.

References

1992
Rankings 1993
Rankings 1992